The discography of American rapper and singer Don Toliver consists of three studio albums, one collaborative album, two mixtapes, and 28 singles (including five as a featured artist).

In 2018, Toliver was featured on his Cactus Jack Records label boss, Travis Scott's song, "Can't Say", which debuted and peaked at number 38 on the Billboard Hot 100. Toliver released his debut studio album, Heaven or Hell, on March 13, 2020. The album debuted and peaked at number seven on the Billboard 200. Later that year, he released a collaboration with Internet Money and Gunna, "Lemonade", which features Nav and peaked at number six on the Hot 100, giving him his highest-charting song.

In 2021, he was featured alongside Kid Cudi on Kanye West's song, "Moon", which peaked at number 20 on the Hot 100. Toliver released his second studio album, Life of a Don, on October 8, 2021. The album debuted and peaked at number two on the Billboard 200.

Studio albums

Collaborative albums

Mixtapes

Singles

As lead artist

As featured artist

Other charted songs

Guest appearances

Notes

References 

Discographies of American artists
Hip hop discographies
Contemporary R&B discographies